The International Council on Archives (ICA; French: Conseil international des archives) is an international non-governmental organization which exists to promote international cooperation for archives and archivists. It was set up in 1948, with Charles Samaran, the then director of the Archives nationales de France, as chairman, and membership is open to national and international organisations, professional groups and individuals. In 2015, it grouped together about 1400 institutional members in 199 countries and territories. Its mission is to promote the conservation, development and use of the world's archives.

ICA has close partnership links with UNESCO, and is a founding member of the Blue Shield, which works to protect the world's cultural heritage threatened by wars and natural disasters, and which is based in The Hague.

Mission statement
ICA's mission statement reads: "The International Council on Archives (ICA) is dedicated to the effective management of records and the preservation, care and use of the world's archival heritage through its representation of records and archive professionals across the globe. Archives are an incredible resource. They are the documentary by-product of human activity and as such are an irreplaceable witness to past events, underpinning democracy, the identity of individuals and communities, and human rights. But they are also fragile and vulnerable. The ICA strives to protect and ensure access to archives through advocacy, setting standards, professional development, and enabling dialogue between archivists, policy makers, creators and users of archives. The ICA is a neutral, non-governmental organisation, funded by its membership, which operates through the activities of that diverse membership. For over sixty years ICA has united archival institutions and practitioners across the globe to advocate for good archival management and the physical protection of recorded heritage, to produce reputable standards and best practices, and to encourage dialogue, exchange, and transmission of this knowledge and expertise across national borders."

Organization
The ICA is organized in thirteen regional branches with varying levels of activity, including the Caribbean branch (CARBICA), the Eastern and Southern Africa branch (ESARBICA), the South and West Asian branch (SWARBICA), the European branch (EURBICA) and the Pacific Region branch (PARBICA). The North American branch (NAANICA) operates "virtually" and by contributions to meetings of the Society of American Archivists and the Association of Canadian Archivists. ICA has twelve professional sections, which provide much of the organization's archival content and activity, including the Section for Archival Education (SAE), the Section for Archives and Human Rights (SAHR), the Section for Architectural Records (SAR), the Section for Business Archives (SBA), the Section for Archives of Literature and Art (SLA), the Section for Local, Municipal and Territorial Archives (SLMT), the Section on Sports Archives (SPO), the Section for Archives of Parliaments and Political Parties (SPP) and the Section for University and Research Institutions (SUV).

It is based in the Marais quarter of the 3rd arrondissement of Paris, rue des Francs-Bourgeois, in the premises of the French national archives.

Member groups include the Arxivers sense Fronteres, among others.

Activities
ICA publishes a review Comma, which appears once or twice a year and includes material in United Nations languages as well as German.

Every fourth year, ICA hosts its major International Congress. In recent years, these have been held in Vienna (2004), Kuala Lumpur (2008), Brisbane (2012) and Seoul (2016). The next ICA Congress will be held in Abu Dhabi in 2023 (delayed from 2020 by the COVID-19 pandemic). Until 2011, ICA also hosted the annual meetings of CITRA, the International Conference of the Round Table on Archives, which brought together heads of national archival institutions, presidents of national professional associations and the ICA sections, branches and committees. The last three CITRA meetings were held in Malta (2009); Oslo, Norway (2010) and Toledo, Spain (2011). After the CITRA in Toledo, ICA replaced CITRA meetings with an annual conference. The first three annual conferences were in European venues: Brussels (2013), Girona (2014) and Reykjavik (2015). These were followed by annual conferences in Mexico City in 2017, Yaoundé in 2018, Adelaide in 2019, and Rome in 2022, before the delayed four-yearly Congress in Abu Dhabi in 2023 and a further Congress in Barcelona in 2025.

ISAD(G)

In 1993, the International Council on Archives approved the first draft of ISAD(G) (General International Standard Archival Description), intended to be a standard for elements that should be included in a finding aid register for archival documents produced by corporations, persons and families.

A revised version, known as ISAD(G)2, was issued in 2000.

See also
 International Standard Archival Authority Record
 Records in Contexts
 List of archives
 Coordinating Council of Audiovisual Archives Association

References

External links
 
 ICA European Branch (EURBICA) web-page
 ICA European Branch (EURBICA) Facebook page
 ICA Pacific Branch (PARBICA) Recordkeeping for Good Governance Toolkit
 ICA Section for Archival Education (SAE) - Training the Trainer Resource Pack
 ICA Section for International Organizations (SIO) - Guide to the Archives of International Organizations
 ICA Section for Literary Archives (SLA) blog
 ICA Section for Local Municipal and Territorial Archives (SLMT) - Constitution (Google docs)
 ICA Section for Professional Associations (SPA): A history of SPA by Didier Grange
 ICA Section for Professional Associations (SPA): SPA brochure on Advocacy

International organizations based in France
Archivist associations
Organizations established in 1948
1948 establishments in France
Organizations based in Paris
History organizations based in France